The Men's Javelin Throw at the 2000 Summer Olympics as part of the athletics program was held at the Olympic Stadium on Friday, 22 September and Saturday, 23 September.

The qualifying athletes progressed through to the final where the qualifying distances are scrapped and they start afresh with up to six throws. The qualifying distance was 83.00 metres. For all qualifiers who did not achieve the standard, the remaining spaces in the final were filled by the longest throws until a total of 12 qualifiers.

Medalists

Schedule
All times are Australian Eastern Standard Time (UTC+10)

Abbreviations

Records

Qualification

Group A

Group B

Final ranking

Final

See also
 1997 Men's World Championships Javelin Throw (Athens)
 1998 Men's European Championships Javelin Throw (Budapest)
 1999 Men's World Championships Javelin Throw (Seville)
 2000 Javelin Throw Year Ranking
 2001 Men's World Championships Javelin Throw (Edmonton)
 2002 Men's European Championships Javelin Throw (Munich)
 2003 Men's World Championships Javelin Throw (Paris)

References

External links
 Results
 la84foundation
 koti.welho

J
Javelin throw at the Olympics
Men's events at the 2000 Summer Olympics